Natural Vibrations, (Natural Vibes for short or known by their fans as Natty Vibes), is a reggae band originally from Kahalu'u, Oahu, Hawaii, based out of San Diego, California with rock and pop influences. The band has received several awards at the Hawaii Music Awards and three Na Hoku Hanohano Awards.

History

Formation
Natural Vibrations was formed by a group of friends who loved playing music; Penidean Pua'auli (lead vocals), Shane Abraham (keyboard, vocals), Kayton "Sly Mongoose" Macariola (percussion, vocals), Ricky "Koa" Ibarra (drums), Keoni Macariola (bass), and Wayne Enos (guitar, vocals) in 1992. They created a unique Hawaiian reggae sound with a party and dance style energy, which is described as "Jawaiian" (infusing Hawaiian music with Jamaican reggae). They became the premiere Hawaiian reggae band at backyard parties and festivals. Romantic love songs and smoking marijuana is a common theme in the band's songs.

Balls Rolling and All Natural
The band's first studio album, Balls Rolling, was released on June 1, 1996, and was a strong debut.

Their second album, All Natural, which was released on Cinnamon Red Records in late 1998. It won the Na Hoku Hanohano Award for best reggae album of the year in 1999.

Getting High & The Circle
Drummer Koa Ibarra was eventually replaced with Stacy Medeiros in 1997, and in 2000 Jehua Evans replaced Keoni Macariola on bass.

In 2000, the band's third album, Getting High, also released on Cinnamon Red Records, won them a second best reggae album award at the Hawaiian Music Awards.

Natty Vibes won the best reggae album category a third time for their fourth album, The Circle on September 2, 2003, which was released on their own label, Natural Vibrations Records. The album also peaked at #12 on the Billboard Top Reggae Albums chart.

From The Heart & Best of album
After five years in which the band concentrated on performing internationally and spending time with their families, their fifth album, From the Heart, was released on April 17, 2007, which in 2008 won a third best reggae album award at the Hawaiian Music Awards. The album gave them their highest Billboard chart placing, peaking at #5 on the Top Reggae Albums chart.

Their first compilation album, Ultimate Vibes, The best of Natural Vibrations, released on May 31, 2009. It peaked at #15 on the Billboard Reggae Albums chart.

Got This Music
Fatty Vibes released their sixth studio album, Got This Music, on September 6, 2011, on Go Aloha Entertainment. It was the band's first LP in five years. The album peaked at #12 on Billboard Reggae Albums charts. The album featured collaborations with Papa T from B.E.T. on two tracks and Jay 2boi, as well as Penidean's daughter Quela Pua'auli-Puahi singing a duet with her father.

After a couple years, Natty Vibes released two singles in 2013, "Make You Stay" on February 2 and "Let It Grow" featuring Marlon Asher on July 16. But the band slowly dismantled after.

Departure of Penidean
In July 2014, after 23 years in Natural Vibrations, Penidean Pua'auli decided to leave the band and move back to Hawaii to focus on family and concrete on a solo career under the name "Peni Dean". He reunited with Kayton Macariola who joined his band on percussion and vocals, and worked on several tracks together.

Reunion
Penidean returned for a Natural Vibrations island-wide reunion tour called The Mahalo Tour in January 2018. It had been five years since the original members performed together and the concert included a two-hour set with over 30 of their greatest hits. It included special guests Three Plus Ekolu, Ho'onu'a, Malino, and Ten Feet.

Penidean was once again on lead vocals for the single "Better Believe" which was released on August 8, 2019.

Legal battle
Penidean did not permanently return to Natty Vibes since the reunion tour. He continued to be a solo artist, along with bandmate Kayton Macariola. Despite writing most of the songs, the band asked him not to perform from the Natural Vibrations catalog while on stage as a solo artist like in the past, going so far as to order a cease and desist order from his former band.

Continuing band
Natural Vibrations was scheduled to perform at the 2020 and 2021 California Roots Festival, but both were postponed then eventually canceled due to the COVID-19 pandemic. On May 27, 2022, Natural Vibrations current lineup performed in "The Bowl" at California Roots Festival.

Lineup

Current band members
 Wayne Enos – Guitar, Vocals (1992–Present)
 Sam Ites – Drums, Vocals (2021-Present)
 Lucas Hom – Keyboard, Vocals (2021-Present)
 Pu'unui – Bass, Vocals (2020-Present)
 Wayne Tejada – Lead Vocals (2021-Present)
 Shane "SKA Squiddy" Abraham – Keyboard, Vocals (1992–Present)
 Jehua Evans – Guitar, Bass, Vocals (2000–Present)

Past band members
 Penidean "Peni Dean" Pua'auli – Lead Vocals (1992–2014, 2018)
 Kayton "Sly Mongoose" Macariola – Percussion, Vocals (1992–2015, 2018)
 Keoni Macariola – Bass (1992–2007)
 Ricky "Koa" Ibarra – Drums (1992–2000)
 Tony Saenz – Drums (2014–2016)
 Brett "Big Chill" Cummings – Saxophone, Vocals (2016)
 Ekona Ravey – Bass, Vocals (2014–2016)
 Jamin "Chief Raga" Wong – Guitar,  Vocals (2014–2016)
 Max O'Leary – Trumpet
 Timothy Pacheco – Drums
 Stacy Medeiros – Drums (2000–2014)

Discography

Studio albums

Compilations
 Ultimate Vibes: The Best of Natural Vibrations (2009), Natural Vibrations Records – Billboard Top Reggae Albums #15

Singles

References

External links
 

Musical groups from Hawaii
American reggae musical groups
Musical groups established in 1993
Mountain Apple Company artists
Na Hoku Hanohano Award winners